Adriano Eusébio (born 1 January 1967), sometimes known as Tino, is a Santomean football manager and former footballer, who currently coaches the São Tomé and Príncipe national team. He was appointed the manager of São Tomé and Príncipe in 2019.

Honours

Player
Bairros Unidos
São Tomé and Príncipe Championship: 1982–83

Manager
Praia Cruz
São Tomé and Príncipe Championship: 2014–15
São Tomé and Príncipe Super Cup: 2014, 2017

References

External links

1967 births
Living people
People from Mé-Zóchi District
São Tomé and Príncipe footballers
São Tomé and Príncipe football managers
São Tomé and Príncipe national football team managers
Association footballers not categorized by position